Ronald Robert Moffatt (August 21, 1905 – August 19, 1960) was an American-born Canadian professional ice hockey player who played 37 games in the National Hockey League. He played for the Detroit Red Wings. Moffatt was born in Westhope, North Dakota, but grew up in Perdue, Saskatchewan.

His hockey career began in the Western Canada Hockey League in 1925-26 with the Saskatoon Crescents and moved to the Saskatoon Sheiks of the Prairie Hockey League. In 1928 he signed on with the Tulsa Oilers and remained for 4 years until 1932 when the Detroit Red Wings signed him as a free agent.

Career statistics

Regular season and playoffs

References

External links
 

1905 births
1960 deaths
American emigrants to Canada
American men's ice hockey left wingers
Detroit Olympics (IHL) players
Detroit Red Wings players
Ice hockey people from Saskatchewan
Portland Buckaroos players
Saskatoon Sheiks players
Seattle Seahawks (ice hockey) players
Spokane Clippers players
Tulsa Oilers (AHA) players
Windsor Bulldogs (1929–1936) players